Union of Lublin is an oil painting by the Polish artist Jan Matejko, finished in 1869, depicting the Union of Lublin. It is owned by the National Museum, Warsaw. and displayed at National Museum of Lublin.

References

1869 paintings
Paintings by Jan Matejko
Paintings in the collection of the National Museum, Warsaw